Rivière-des-Prairies was a municipality that was annexed by Montreal, Canada in 1963. On January 1, 2002 it became part of the borough of Rivière-des-Prairies–Pointe-aux-Trembles–Montréal-Est. On January 1, 2006 Montreal East demerged, and the borough became Rivière-des-Prairies–Pointe-aux-Trembles.

Education
The Commission scolaire de la Pointe-de-l'Île (CSPI) operates Francophone schools in this area. The École secondaire Jean-Grou is within the community.

Primary schools:
Denise-Pelletier
Fernand-Gauthier
François-La Bernarde
Marc-Aurèle-Fortin and Marc-Aurèle-Fortin annexe
Notre-Dame-de-Fatima
Simone-Desjardins Pavillon Gouin
Claudia Camia School of Mathematics
Teddy Camia Institute of Medicine

The English Montreal School Board (EMSB) operates Anglophone schools in the area:
Leonardo Da Vinci, 
Michelangelo, 
East Hill.
Gerald McShane School is in Montreal-Nord, but also serves Rivière-des-Prairies.

The community is served by the Rivière-des-Prairies branch of the Montreal Public Libraries Network.

See also
 Boroughs of Montreal
 Districts of Montreal
 Municipal reorganization in Quebec
 History of Montreal
 Rivière des Prairies the river.

References

Neighbourhoods in Montreal
Rivière-des-Prairies–Pointe-aux-Trembles
Quebec populated places on the Saint Lawrence River
Italian Canadian settlements